Action is a French television channel which shows action films.

History
A TV channel dedicated to films (cinema and telefilm) in the action genre, was commercially launched as part of the AB Sat package in 1996.

It is also the name of a channel of the Starz Encore Group in Canada.

Budget
Action is run by AB Sat SA with a budget of €24 million, provided 100%  by AB Groupe.

Programming 
 Lucha Underground
Season 4 is being broadcast in 2019, narrated by Marc Chavet and Jerome Pourrut. 
 WWE NXT

Broadcast
Action is broadcast on the "Ciné-Séries" bouquet of Canal+ and the "Cinérama" (now "Panorama" in satellite) bouquet from Bis Télévisions, on cable, and on ADSL.

It ceased transmissions on StarTimes in 2020.

References

External links
 Official site of the Action channel
 Programmes on Action

See also
 AB Groupe

Mediawan Thematics
Television channels and stations established in 1996
1996 establishments in France
French-language television stations
Television stations in France